Broken Star is a 2018 American psychological thriller film directed by Dave Schwep and starring Analeigh Tipton and Tyler Labine.

Cast
Analeigh Tipton as Markey
Tyler Labine as Daryl
Lauren Bowles as Kara
Monique Coleman as Annie

Release
In April 2018, it was announced that the rights to the film were acquired by Gravitas Ventures.

The film was released in theaters and on VOD on July 20, 2018.

Reception
Noel Murray of the Los Angeles Times gave the film a negative review and wrote, "But when the plot finally kicks in, it feels like an afterthought — as though director Dave Schwep and screenwriter David Lee Brant realized too late that they needed something more than two damaged folks in a tacky old house."

Nick Schager of Variety also gave the film a negative review and wrote, "The story of a starlet under house arrest who forms an unhealthy bond with her landlord, it’s a low-rent effort that’s equal parts tawdry and tedious, although more problematic for its theatrical and on-demand fortunes is the fact that, from start to finish, it makes little lucid sense."

References

External links
 
 

2018 films
2018 psychological thriller films
American psychological thriller films
2010s English-language films
2010s American films